This is a list of companies that have produced miniature models for tabletop games.

Alternative Armies - Scottish company
Archive Miniatures & Game Systems - Early producer of miniatures for role-playing games
Asgard Miniatures - Early British company based in Nottingham
Chronicle Figures - Early British company that produced role-playing game miniatures
Citadel Miniatures - Produces miniatures for Games Workshop games
CMON Limited
Dixon Miniatures - British company
Essex Miniatures - British company
Games Workshop - Has produced miniatures for its own games
Grenadier Models Inc.
Impact! Miniatures
Mantic Games
Martian Metals - Produced miniatures in the 1970s and 1980s for tabletop games
Privateer Press
RAFM Company
Ral Partha Enterprises
Reaper Miniatures
Torchlight Fantasy Products - British company active in the 1980s
Wargames Factory
WizKids
Wyrd

References

Game manufacturers
Miniature figures